Admiral Ford may refer to:

John Ford (1894–1973), U.S. Navy rear admiral
John Ford (Royal Navy officer) (died 1796), British Royal Navy vice admiral
John D. Ford (1840–1918), U.S. Navy rear admiral
Wilbraham Ford (1880–1964), British Royal Navy vice admiral